Dipterosaccus is a genus of barnacle.

Species
 Dipterosaccus indicus Van Kampen & Boschma, 1925
 Dipterosaccus shiinoi Yoshida, Hirose & Hirose, 2013

References

Barnacles